The Nokia 6720 is a mid-range Symbian OS smartphone released by Nokia. It was unveiled to public in Barcelona and Singapore on February 16, 2009.  It is the successor of the Nokia 6220 classic and features several improvement over its predecessor, such as the addition of A-GPS and noise cancellation. Like the 6220, it offers features comparable to the higher end models, although the Xenon flash previously featured in the 6220 is now replaced by a conventional LED flash for higher power efficiency.

Specifications
2.2 inches, 240 x 320 pixels
microSD, up to 16GB, 1 GB included
50 MB shared memory
ARM 11 600 MHz processor
HSDPA, 10.2 Mbit/s
HSUPA, 2 Mbit/s
Bluetooth v2.0 with A2DP
microUSB
Symbian OS, S60 rel. 3.2
MP, 2592×1944 pixels, Carl Zeiss Optics, autofocus, video(VGA@15), LED flash; secondary VGA videocall camera
Built-in GPS receiver
A-GPS support
Nokia Maps 3.0
Stereo FM radio with RDS
3.5 mm AV jack
TV-out

References

External links

 http://europe.nokia.com/find-products/devices/nokia-6720-classic

6720
Mobile phones introduced in 2009